Annals of the Later Han or Hou Hanji (後漢紀) is a Chinese history book of the Eastern Han dynasty. It was written by Yuan Hong (328–376) during the Jin dynasty (266–420). Yuan spent eight years to complete his Annals. The annals contain 30 books with some 210 thousand Chinese characters. It covers the period from the farmers' revolts of the later years of Wang Mang to the years when Cao Pi, and Liu Bei became emperors; therefore it covers roughly 200 years. The annals were written 50 years earlier than Fan Ye (historian)'s Book of the Later Han, and it is one of two surviving history books of Eastern Han dynasty.

Contents
 Book 1 光武皇帝 Emperor Guangwu
 Book 2 光武皇帝
 Book 3 光武皇帝
 Book 4 光武皇帝
 Book 5 光武皇帝
 Book 6 光武皇帝
 Book 7 光武皇帝
 Book 8 光武皇帝
 Book 9  孝明皇帝 (1/2) Emperor Ming
 Book 10 孝明皇帝 (2/2)
 Book 11 孝章皇帝 (1/2) Emperor Zhang
 Book 12 孝章皇帝 (2/2)
 Book 13 孝和皇帝 (1/2) Emperor He
 Book 14 孝和皇帝 (2/2)
 Book 15 孝殤皇帝  Emperor Shang
 Book 16 孝安皇帝 (1/2) Emperor An
 Book 17 孝安皇帝 (2/2)
 Book 18 孝順皇帝 (1/2) Emperor Shun
 Book 19 孝順皇帝 (2/2)
 Book 20 孝質皇帝  Emperor Zhi
 Book 21 孝桓皇帝 (1/2) Emperor Huan
 Book 22 孝桓皇帝 (2/2)
 Book 23 孝靈皇帝 (1/3) Emperor Ling
 Book 24 孝靈皇帝 (2/3)
 Book 25 孝靈皇帝 (3/3)
 Book 26 孝獻皇帝  Emperor Xian
 Book 27 孝獻皇帝 
 Book 28 孝獻皇帝 
 Book 29 孝獻皇帝 
 Book 30 孝獻皇帝

Chinese history texts
4th-century history books
History books about the Han dynasty